Cajus may refer to:

 Caius of Korea (1571–1624), Roman Catholic martyr
 Cajus Schmiedtlein (c. 1555–1611), German composer and organist
 Theretra cajus, a moth of family Sphingidae
 The Latin praenomen Gaius, also spelled Cajus